Kadłub  is a village in the administrative district of Gmina Strzelce Opolskie, within Strzelce County, Opole Voivodeship, in southern Poland.

History
In the 10th century the area became part of the emerging Polish state, and later on, it was part of Poland, Bohemia (Czechia), Prussia, and Germany. In 1936, during a massive Nazi campaign of renaming of placenames, the village was renamed to Starenheim to erase traces of Polish origin. During World War II, the Germans operated the E297 forced labour subcamp of the Stalag VIII-B/344 prisoner-of-war camp in the village. After the defeat of Germany in the war, in 1945, the village became again part of Poland and its historic name was restored.

References

Villages in Strzelce County